The dogcow, named Clarus, is a bitmapped image designed by Apple for the demonstration of page layout in the classic Mac OS. The sound she makes is "Moof!", a portmanteau of "moo" and "woof". Clarus became the archetype of surrealistic humor in the corporate culture of the original Macintosh group, particularly as the mascot of Apple’s Developer Technical Support as officially documented in Technote #31.

History
In 1983, the dog icon had been created by Susan Kare as the glyph for "z", as part of the Cairo font. Later, when redesigning the classic Mac OS "Page Setup" print dialog box for the LaserWriter, an example image was required. According to HCI engineer Annette Wagner,

The new dog graphic had a more bovine look.

On October 15, 1987, the term "dogcow" was coined by Scott Zimmerman. She was later named Clarus by Mark "The Red" Harlan, as a joking reference to Claris, Apple's business unit for office software at the time.

The Clarus icon became one of the giant pieces of pixel art in the Icon Garden in the front yard of the Apple Campus at 1 Infinite Loop; the Icon Garden has since been removed.

Apple's Developer CD Series of the 1980s features a dogcow logo on the discs.

The latest references to the dogcow came in the documentation for the Swift programming language, which uses the word "dogcow" as an example of the use of Unicode characters to name constants and variables; and in a sticker pack in Messages.

In the first beta of macOS Ventura, the dogcow returned to the page setup window, and in iOS 16 entering 'Clarus' or 'Moof' results in the keyboard suggesting the 'dog' and 'cow' Emoji.

Overview

The sound she makes is "Moof!", and in early versions of Apple Developer CDs one section was known as "Moof!".

The dogcow symbol and "Moof!" were proprietary trademarks of Apple until the registration was cancelled in 1999.

Reception
The disappearance of the Icon Garden and of Clarus from Apple's products is seen by MacWorld as a symbol of the draining of culture and character from, and an increase in blankness and austerity in, Apple's products over the years. In a 2015 retrospective, the magazine said Clarus "came into being through quirkiness and serendipity, and you could say it has no business in a grown-up, commercial operating system. It makes no real sense, and wasn’t really there on merit or through strategic planning" and represented a company that was "kooky", "idiosyncratic", and not dominated by rules.

See also 

Sad Mac

External links
Archive of a page of official Apple information on the dogcow
Technical Note 1031 on Apple’s website (archived February 4, 2004)
ClarusX2014 - A system utility to install Clarus and other dogcattle into OS X Mavericks
Clarus the Dogcow (Moof!) - A history of Clarus (YouTube video)

References 

Apple Inc.
Classic Mac OS
Computer folklore
Dog mascots
Mascots introduced in 1983